The following is a list of paintings by Sofonisba Anguissola that are generally accepted as autograph.

Sources
 Sofonisba Anguissola e le sue sorelle, Centro Culturale, Cremona, 6 September - 11 December 1994, 
 Sofonisba Anguissola in the RKD
 

 
Anguissola